Nicola "Nikki" Twohig (born 28 April 1987) is a female football defender from Manchester. She played for Liverpool Ladies in the 2011 FA WSL and rejoined Blackburn Rovers Ladies for a third spell in August 2011.  She represented the Republic of Ireland at U-19 level.

Club career
Twohig played for Blackburn Rovers Ladies before leaving to join Manchester City Ladies. She rejoined Blackburn in October 2007. Her first top-flight goal came in January 2008, against Doncaster Rovers Belles.

Having become captain of Blackburn, Twohig left to sign for Liverpool Ladies in February 2011. Twohig has returned to Blackburn Rovers Ladies in August 2012.

International career
In October 2006 Twohig played for the Republic of Ireland U-19 team in friendlies against the Netherlands and Switzerland.

Blackburn statistics

References

1987 births
Living people
English women's footballers
Footballers from Manchester
Blackburn Rovers L.F.C. players
FA Women's National League players
Republic of Ireland women's association footballers
Women's Super League players
Manchester City W.F.C. players
Women's association football defenders
Republic of Ireland women's youth international footballers